Gooderham/Pencil Lake Water Aerodrome  is located  south southeast of Gooderham, Ontario, Canada.

References

Registered aerodromes in Ontario
Seaplane bases in Ontario